RPM Records was an American Los Angeles-based record label launched in 1950. This is not the same RPM used by Tony Bennett, nor is it related to labels in the UK and South Africa.

RPM was a subsidiary of Modern Records and part of the Bihari Brothers record empire.

Ike Turner, who was a talent scout for the Bihari Brothers, arranged for many blues musicians such as Howlin' Wolf, B.B. King, and Roscoe Gordon to record for the Biharis. King released many successful singles on the RPM label. Paul Anka released his first single on RPM in 1956.

In 1957, the Bihari Brothers announced that they were halting all album releases on both Modern and RPM, and that their released and scheduled albums for Modern and RPM would be issued on their Crown Records label.

The catalogs and master tapes were sold to Ace Records (UK) in the 1990s.

Selected discography

See also
 List of record labels
RPM Records artists

References

External links

 http://www.globaldogproductions.info/r/rpm.html list of single releases
 RPM Records on the Internet Archive's Great 78 Project

Defunct record labels of the United States
Record labels established in 1949
1949 establishments in California
Companies based in Los Angeles